The Zethinae are a subfamily of wasps in the family Vespidae, the members of which are referred to as potter wasps owing to their method of nest construction.

Taxonomy

Zethines were formerly included in the subfamily Eumeninae, also known as potter wasps, until it was recognized that the zethine lineage rendered Eumeninae paraphyletic.

References

Vespidae
Potter wasps